Tengku Abdul Hamid bin Tengku Jumat  (12 April 1917 – 16 April 1978) was a Malaysian politician and diplomat who served as Deputy Chief Minister of Singapore between 1956 and 1959. Prior to his appointment as Deputy Chief Minister, he served as Minister of Local Government, Lands and Housing between 1956 and 1959, and Minister of Communications and Works between 1955 and 1956. He is also the founder of the United Malays National Organisation (UMNO) in Singapore.

Early life and education
Tengku Abdul Hamid was born on 12 April 1916 in Singapore. His father was Tengku Mashoordin Jumat a police inspector and court interpreter, and his mother was Aishah Hannan. Abdul was educated at Raffles Institution.

Career

Abdul Hamid first started out as a skins exporter with his own company until around 1955, when he founded the Singapore division of the United Malays National Organisation (UMNO). Abdul Hamid was a member of Labour Front. 

Following David Marshall's appointment as Chief Minister in 1955, Abdul was subsequently appointed as Minister of Local Government, Lands, and Housing, though he was initially intended to be Minister of Communication and Works. 

Cited as "Singapore's first minister of Malay descent", he hold the position until June 1959. Abdul became the "first Singapore Ambassador to Germany". He was also the inaugural ambassador to other countries, such as Egypt, the Netherlands, and the Philippines. In addition, Abdul served as Deputy Chief Minister of Singapore between 1956 and 1959. 

Abdul was conferred the title of Dato' and the Order of the Defender of the Realm, rank Commander of the Order of the Defender of the Realm.

Personal life
Tengku Abdul Hamid had seven children. His youngest child, Tengku Putra Haron Jumat (born 1963), is a Malaysian politician who is a member of Barisan Nasional. 

During his political career, Abdul was an acquaintance with Lee Kuan Yew, although they were not in the same political party.

Death
In 1973, Abdul Hamid went back to Malaysia, where he lived most of his later life as ambassador to various countries. He died some five years later in 1978.

Honour

Foreign honour
 Malaya
 Honorary Commander of the Order of the Defender of the Realm (PMN) – Tan Sri (1958)

References

External links

1917 births
1978 deaths
Singaporean emigrants to Malaysia
Members of the Parliament of Singapore
Labour Front politicians
Raffles Institution alumni
20th-century Singaporean politicians
Ambassadors of Malaysia to Egypt
Ambassadors of Malaysia to the Netherlands
Ambassadors of Malaysia to Germany
Singaporean people of Malay descent
Singaporean Muslims
Honorary Commanders of the Order of the Defender of the Realm